Lo Chia-ling (Chinese: 羅嘉翎, pinyin: Luó Jiālíng; born October 8, 2001) is a taekwondo athlete from Taiwan. 
After twice winning the gold medal at the World Taekwondo Junior Championships (in 2016 and 2018), she reached the Round of 16 at 2019 World Taekwondo Championships – Women's featherweight.

Having secured her berth at the 2021 Asian Taekwondo Olympic Qualification Tournament in Amman, Lo won the bronze medal in the 57 kg at the 2020 Olympics.. 

She won the silver medal in the women's featherweight event at the 2022 World Taekwondo Championships held in Guadalajara, Mexico.

References

External links
 

Taiwanese female taekwondo practitioners
2001 births
Living people
Taekwondo practitioners at the 2020 Summer Olympics
Olympic taekwondo practitioners of Taiwan
Olympic bronze medalists for Taiwan
Medalists at the 2020 Summer Olympics
Olympic medalists in taekwondo
21st-century Taiwanese women
World Taekwondo Championships medalists